The Joseph Webb House is a historic Georgian-style house at 211 Main Street in Wethersfield, Connecticut.  It was designated a National Historic Landmark for its significance as the location of the General George Washington/Rochambeau (French commander) five-day military conference held in 1781 during the American Revolutionary War that preceded the Siege of Yorktown, the last major battle of the war in North America.  Washington, in his words, "lodged...at the house of Joseph Webb", on the May 17, 1781.  Located in Old Wethersfield, the Joseph Webb House is owned by the Webb-Deane-Stevens Museum and serves as its headquarters.  The interior has been restored to an 18th-century appearance and the grounds feature a Colonial Revival garden and 19th-century barn in back.

Originally built in 1752 for Joseph Webb, the house remained in the family until around 1820 when it was sold to Martin Welles. It remained in the Welles family until 1913 when it was purchased by a group of businessmen who intended to use it as an athenaeum or a library, but a lack of funds saw its resale to Wallace Nutting. The house opened in 1916 as a part of Nutting's "Chain of Colonial Picture Houses". Nutting sold the house to the National Society of the Colonial Dames of America in 1919, who continue to operate it as a historic house museum. In 1996 and later in 2007, Nutting's murals and interpretive Colonial Revival elements were acknowledged and integrated with an exhibit showing his influence.

History
Framed by Judah Wright in 1752 for Joseph Webb, the -story house was designed with a large gambrel roof that provides extra storage space. Webb was a successful merchant who had ships trading in the West Indies and ran a local store; he married Mehitabel Nott and had six children before his death at the age of 34. The executor of the estate was Silas Deane who assisted Mrs. Webb financially and emotionally. Deane later married Mrs. Webb and built a house next door. The eldest child, Joseph Webb Jr., then 12 at the time of his father's death, inherited the house.

In 1774, Joseph Webb Jr., also a successful merchant, married Abigail Chester and the couple remained in the house; they became well-known hosts and their house was nicknamed "Hospitality Hall". The house's fame stems from George Washington's five night stay in the house, where he planned the Siege of Yorktown that led to American Independence with French general Comte de Rochambeau. Smithsonian magazine writer Howard Hugh suggests that the red wool flock wallpaper in the bedchamber where Washington slept was hung in anticipation of the general's arrival.

Webb Jr. sold the house in 1790 and it passed through different owners until it was purchased by Judge Martin Welles around 1820. Welles went on to modernize the southern half of the property. The house remained in the Welles family until the death of Welles' grandson in 1913. The house was purchased by a group of businessmen who sought to operate it as athenaeum or a library; however a lack of funds resulted in its sale to Wallace Nutting in 1916.

Wallace Nutting 
The Joseph Webb House was bought by antiquarian Wallace Nutting on February 9, 1916, to serve as a sales area and studio. Lyle writes that Nutting intended to use the house "as one of the links in his 'Chain of Colonial Picture Houses'—all important historic sites located in New England that were part of his business plan to promote a nostalgic appreciation of 'Old America.'" Nutting commissioned painted murals for the front parlors and hallway.

On July 4, 1916, the Webb house was opened to the public with a 25 cent admission charge, but the American entry into World War I and the rationing of gasoline took its toll on Nutting's business. Nutting sold the house in 1919 to The National Society of the Colonial Dames of America in Connecticut, which opened it to the public as a historic house museum.

Colonial Dames 
The National Society of the Colonial Dames of America restored the house to before Nutting's changes with a team of preservationists; with the intention of restoring the appearance of the original construction.

The murals commissioned by Nutting were covered up with reproduction wallpapers, but a panel of the wall paper was torn off and the hallway murals were painted over. In 1996, the Dames acknowledged Wallace Nutting's interpretive focus of the Webb House and removed the wallpaper in the "Yorktown" parlor.  In 2007, the murals in the northeast parlor were uncovered and reinterpretation of the room around the Colonial Revival period. An exhibit in the center hall of the house shows Wallace Nutting's influence.

The Webb-Deane-Stevens Museum gives tours of the house April through November, but requires appointments for tours for January through March. The house was declared a National Historic Landmark in 1961. It was added to the National Register of Historic Places on October 15, 1966.

See also
 National Register of Historic Places listings in Hartford County, Connecticut
 List of National Historic Landmarks in Connecticut
 List of the oldest buildings in Connecticut
 March Route of Rochambeau's army
 List of historic sites preserved along Rochambeau's route

References

External links

 Webb-Deane-Stevens Museum

Houses in Wethersfield, Connecticut
Museums in Hartford County, Connecticut
Historic house museums in Connecticut
National Historic Landmarks in Connecticut
Houses completed in 1752
Houses on the National Register of Historic Places in Connecticut
Historic places on the Washington–Rochambeau Revolutionary Route
Georgian architecture in Connecticut
National Register of Historic Places in Hartford County, Connecticut
Historic district contributing properties in Connecticut
1752 establishments in Connecticut